Oliver Byrne may refer to:
 Oliver Byrne (football chairman)
 Oliver Byrne (mathematician)